Baileys Corner is an unincorporated community in Gillam Township, Jasper County, Indiana.

Geography

References

Unincorporated communities in Jasper County, Indiana
Unincorporated communities in Indiana